The Caucasus or Caucasia, is a region between the Black Sea and the Caspian Sea, mainly comprising Armenia, Azerbaijan, Georgia, and parts of Southern Russia. The Caucasus Mountains, including the Greater Caucasus range, have historically been considered as a natural barrier between Eastern Europe and Western Asia.

Mount Elbrus in Russia, Europe's highest mountain, is situated in the Western Caucasus. On the southern side, the Lesser Caucasus includes the Javakheti Plateau and the Armenian highlands, part of which is in Turkey.

The Caucasus is divided into the North Caucasus and South Caucasus, although the Western Caucasus also exists as a distinct geographic space within the North Caucasus. The Greater Caucasus mountain range in the north is mostly shared by Russia and Georgia as well as the northernmost parts of Azerbaijan. The Lesser Caucasus mountain range in the south is occupied by several independent states, mostly by Armenia, Azerbaijan, and Georgia, but also extending to parts of northeastern Turkey, northern Iran and the self-proclaimed Republic of Artsakh.

The region is known for its linguistic diversity: aside from Indo-European and Turkic languages, the Kartvelian, Northwest Caucasian, and Northeast Caucasian language families are indigenous to the area.

Origin of the name
Pliny the Elder's Natural History (77–79 AD) derives the name of the Caucasus from a Scythian name, Croucasis, which supposedly means 'shimmering with snow'. German linguist Paul Kretschmer notes that the Latvian word kruvesis also means 'ice' (actually 'frozen mud').

In the Tale of Past Years (1113 AD), it is stated that Old East Slavic Кавкасийскыѣ горы (Kavkasijskyě gory) came from Ancient Greek Καύκασος (Kaúkasos), which, according to M. A. Yuyukin, is a compound word that can be interpreted as the 'mountain of the seagull(s)' (καύ-: καύαξ, καύηξ, -ηκος, κήξ, κηϋξ 'a kind of seagull' + the reconstructed *κάσος 'mountain' or 'rock' richly attested both in place and personal names).

In Georgian tradition, the term Caucasus is derived from Caucas ( Ḳavḳasosi), the son of the Biblical Togarmah and legendary forefather of Nakh peoples.

According to German philologists Otto Schrader and Alfons A. Nehring, the Ancient Greek word Καύκασος (Kaukasos) is connected to Gothic hauhs 'high' as well as Lithuanian kaũkas 'hillock' and kaukarà 'hill, top'. British linguist Adrian Room claims that *kau- also means 'mountain' in Pelasgian, though this is speculative given that Pelasgian is so poorly known.

Toponyms

The term Caucasus is not only used for the mountains themselves but also includes Ciscaucasia (which is part of the Russian Federation) and Transcaucasia. According to Alexander Mikaberidze, Transcaucasia is a "Russo-centric" term.

The Transcaucasus region and Dagestan were the furthest points of Parthian and later Sasanian expansions, with areas to the north of the Greater Caucasus range practically impregnable. The mythological Mount Qaf, the world's highest mountain that ancient Iranian lore shrouded in mystery, was said to be situated in this region. The region is also one of the candidates for the location of Airyanem Vaejah, the apparent homeland of the Iranians of Zoroaster. In Middle Persian sources of the Sasanian era, the Caucasus range was referred to as Kaf Kof. The term resurfaced in Iranian tradition later on in a variant form when Ferdowsi, in his Shahnameh, referred to the Caucasus mountains as Kōh-i Kāf. "Most of the modern names of the Caucasus originate from the Greek Kaukasos (Lat., Caucasus) and the Middle Persian Kaf Kof".

"The earliest etymon" of the name the Caucasus comes from Kaz-kaz, the Hittite designation of the "inhabitants of the southern coast of the Black Sea".

It was also noted that in Nakh Ков гас (Kov gas) means "gateway to steppe".

Endonyms and exonyms
The modern endonym for the region is usually similar in many languages, and is generally between Kavkaz and Kaukaz.

 Kavkaz
 Kʺaukʺaz/s
 al-Qawqāz
 Kovkas
 Kawkaz

 Kawkaz
 K'avk'asia

 Káfkasos
 Kawkaz
 Kavkaz
 Qawqaz

 Kkawkkaz
 K'awk'az
 K'avk'acia
 Kavkaz/Kaukazi
 Qafqāz
 Kavkaz
 Kavkaz

 Kavkaz

Political geography

The North Caucasus region is known as the Ciscaucasus, whereas the South Caucasus region is commonly known as the Transcaucasus.

The Ciscaucasus contains most of the Greater Caucasus mountain range. It consists of Southern Russia, mainly the North Caucasian Federal District's autonomous republics, and the northernmost parts of Georgia and Azerbaijan. The Ciscaucasus lies between the Black Sea to its west, the Caspian Sea to its east, and borders the Southern Federal District to its north. The two Federal Districts are collectively referred to as "Southern Russia".

The Transcaucasus borders the Greater Caucasus range and Southern Russia to its north, the Black Sea and Turkey to its west, the Caspian Sea to its east, and Iran to its south. It contains the Lesser Caucasus mountain range and surrounding lowlands. All of Armenia, Azerbaijan (excluding the northernmost parts), and Georgia (excluding the northernmost parts) are in the South Caucasus.

The watershed along the Greater Caucasus range is considered by some sources to be the dividing line between Europe and Southwest Asia. According to that, the highest peak in the Caucasus, Mount Elbrus (5,642 meters) located in western Ciscaucasus, is considered the highest point in Europe. The Kuma-Manych Depression, the geologic depression that divides the Russian Plain from the North Caucasus foreland is often regarded by classical and non-British sources as the natural and historical boundary between Europe and Asia. Another opinion is that the rivers Kura and Rioni mark this border, or even that of the river Aras.

The Caucasus is a linguistically, culturally and geographically diverse region. The nation states that compose the Caucasus today are the post-Soviet states Georgia (including Adjara and Abkhazia), Azerbaijan (including Nakhchivan), Armenia, and the Russian Federation. The Russian divisions include Dagestan, Chechnya, Ingushetia, Adygea, Krasnodar Krai, and Stavropol Krai, in clockwise order.

Three territories in the region claim independence but are recognized as such by only a handful of entities:  , Abkhazia, and South Ossetia.

General statistics of South Caucasian states

Demographics

The region has many different languages and language families. There are more than 50 ethnic groups living in the region. No fewer than three language families are unique to the area. In addition, Indo-European languages, such as East Slavic, Armenian and Ossetian, and Turkic languages, such as Azerbaijani, Kumyk language and Karachay–Balkar, are spoken in the area. Russian is used as a lingua franca most notably in the North Caucasus.

The peoples of the northern and southern Caucasus mostly are Shia Muslims, Sunni Muslims, Eastern Orthodox Christians or Armenian Christians.

History

Located on the peripheries of Turkey, Iran, and Russia, the region has been an arena for political, military, religious, and cultural rivalries and expansionism for centuries. Throughout its history, the Caucasus was usually incorporated into the Iranian world. At the beginning of the 19th century, the Russian Empire conquered the territory from Qajar Iran.

Prehistory

The territory of the Caucasus region was inhabited by Homo erectus since the Paleolithic Era. In 1991, early human (that is, hominin) fossils dating back 1.8 million years were found at the Dmanisi archaeological site in Georgia. Scientists now classify the assemblage of fossil skeletons as the subspecies Homo erectus georgicus.

The site yields the earliest unequivocal evidence for the presence of early humans outside the African continent; and the Dmanisi skulls are the five oldest hominins ever found outside Africa.

Antiquity
Kura–Araxes culture from about 4000 BC until about 2000 BC enveloped a vast area approximately 1,000 km by 500 km, and mostly encompassed, on modern-day territories, the Southern Caucasus (except western Georgia), northwestern Iran, the northeastern Caucasus, eastern Turkey, and as far as Syria.

Under Ashurbanipal (669–627 BC), the boundaries of the Assyrian Empire reached as far as the Caucasus Mountains. Later ancient kingdoms of the region included Armenia, Albania, Colchis and Iberia, among others. These kingdoms were later incorporated into various Iranian empires, including Media, the Achaemenid Empire, Parthia, and the Sassanid Empire, who would altogether rule the Caucasus for many hundreds of years. In 95–55 BC, under the reign of Armenian king Tigranes the Great, the Kingdom of Armenia included Kingdom of Armenia, vassals Iberia, Albania, Parthia, Atropatene, Mesopotamia, Cappadocia, Cilicia, Syria, Nabataean kingdom, and Judea. By the time of the first century BC, Zoroastrianism had become the dominant religion of the region; however, the region would go through two other religious transformations. Owing to the strong rivalry between Persia and Rome, and later Byzantium. The Romans first arrived in the region in the 1st century BC with the annexation of the kingdom of Colchis, which was later turned into the province of Lazicum. The next 600 years was marked by a conflict between Rome and Sassanid Empire for the control of the region. In western Georgia the eastern Roman rule lasted until the Middle Ages.

Middle Ages

As the Arsacid dynasty of Armenia (an eponymous branch of the Arsacid dynasty of Parthia) was the first nation to adopt Christianity as state religion (in 301 AD), and Caucasian Albania and Georgia had become Christian entities, Christianity began to overtake Zoroastrianism and pagan beliefs. With the Muslim conquest of Persia, large parts of the region came under the rule of the Arabs, and Islam penetrated into the region.

In the 10th century, the Alans (proto-Ossetians) founded the Kingdom of Alania, that flourished in the Northern Caucasus, roughly in the location of latter-day Circassia and modern North Ossetia–Alania, until its destruction by the Mongol invasion in 1238–39.

During the Middle Ages Bagratid Armenia, Kingdom of Tashir-Dzoraget, Kingdom of Syunik and Principality of Khachen organized local Armenian population facing multiple threats after the fall of antique Kingdom of Armenia. Caucasian Albania maintained close ties with Armenia and the Church of Caucasian Albania shared same Christian dogmas with the Armenian Apostolic Church and had a tradition of their Catholicos being ordained through the Patriarch of Armenia.

In the 12th century, the Georgian king David the Builder drove the Muslims out from Caucasus and made the Kingdom of Georgia a strong regional power. In 1194–1204 Georgian Queen Tamar's armies crushed new Seljuk Turkish invasions from the south-east and south and launched several successful campaigns into Seljuk Turkish-controlled Southern Armenia. The Georgian Kingdom continued military campaigns in the Caucasus region. As a result of her military campaigns and the temporary fall of the Byzantine Empire in 1204, Georgia became the strongest Christian state in the whole Near East area, encompassing most of the Caucasus stretching from Northern Iran and Northeastern Turkey to the North Caucasus.

The Caucasus region was conquered by the Ottomans, Turco-Mongols, local kingdoms and khanates, as well as, once again, Iran.

Modern period

Up to and including the early 19th century, the Southern Caucasus and southern Dagestan all formed part of the Persian Empire. In 1813 and 1828 by the Treaty of Gulistan and the Treaty of Turkmenchay respectively, the Persians were forced to irrevocably cede the Southern Caucasus and Dagestan to Imperial Russia. In the ensuing years after these gains, the Russians took the remaining part of the Southern Caucasus, comprising western Georgia, through several wars from the Ottoman Empire.

In the second half of the 19th century, the Russian Empire also conquered the Northern Caucasus. In the aftermath of the Caucasian Wars, an ethnic cleansing of Circassians was performed by Russia in which the indigenous peoples of this region, mostly Circassians, were expelled from their homeland and forced to move primarily to the Ottoman Empire.

Having killed and deported most of Armenians of Western Armenia during the Armenian genocide, the Turks intended to eliminate the Armenian population of Eastern Armenia. During the 1920 Turkish–Armenian War, 60,000 to 98,000 Armenian civilians were estimated to have been killed by the Turkish army.

In the 1940s, around 480,000 Chechens and Ingush, 120,000 Karachay–Balkars and Meskhetian Turks, thousands of Kalmyks, and 200,000 Kurds in Nakchivan and Caucasus Germans were deported en masse to Central Asia and Siberia by the Soviet security apparatus. About a quarter of them died.

The Southern Caucasus region was unified as a single political entity twice – during the Russian Civil War (Transcaucasian Democratic Federative Republic) from 9 April 1918 to 26 May 1918, and under the Soviet rule (Transcaucasian SFSR) from 12 March 1922 to 5 December 1936. Following the dissolution of the Soviet Union in 1991, Georgia, Azerbaijan and Armenia became independent nations.

The region has been subject to various territorial disputes since the collapse of the Soviet Union, leading to the First Nagorno-Karabakh War (1988–1994), the East Prigorodny Conflict (1989–1991), the War in Abkhazia (1992–93), the First Chechen War (1994–1996), the Second Chechen War (1999–2009), Russo-Georgian War (2008), and the Second Nagorno-Karabakh War (2020).

Mythology
In Greek mythology, the Caucasus was one of the pillars supporting the world. After presenting man with the gift of fire, Prometheus (or Amirani in the Georgian version) was chained there by Zeus, to have his liver eaten daily by an eagle as punishment for defying Zeus's wish to keep the "secret of fire" from humans.

In Persian mythology, the Caucasus might be associated with the mythic Mount Qaf which is believed to surround the known world. It is the battlefield of Saoshyant and the nest of the Simurgh.

The Roman poet Ovid placed the Caucasus in Scythia and depicted it as a cold and stony mountain which was the abode of personified hunger. The Greek hero Jason sailed to the west coast of the Caucasus in pursuit of the Golden Fleece, and there met Medea, a daughter of King Aeëtes of Colchis.

Later folklore
The Caucasus has a rich folklore tradition. This tradition has been preserved orally—necessitated by the fact that for most of the languages involved there was no alphabet until the early twentieth century—and only began to be written down in the late nineteenth century. One important tradition is that of the Nart sagas, which tell stories of a race of ancient heroes called the Narts. These sagas include such figures as Satanaya, the mother of the Narts, Sosruquo a shape changer and trickster, Tlepsh a blacksmith god, and Batradz, a mighty hero. The folklore of the Caucasus shows ancient Iranian Zoroastrian influence, involve battles with ancient Goths, Huns and Khazars, and contain many connections with ancient Indian, Norse Scandinavian, and Greek cultures.

Links between Greek mythology and subsequent folklore
Caucasian folklore contains many links with the myths of the ancient Greeks. There are resemblances between the mother goddess Satanaya and the Greek goddess of love Aphrodite. The story of how the trickster Nart Sosruquo, became invulnerable parallels that of the Greek hero Achilles. The ancient Greek Amazons may be connected to a Caucasian "warrior Forest-Mother, Amaz-an".

Caucasian legends include stories involving giants similar to Homer's Polyphemus story. In these stories, the giant is almost always a shepherd, and he is variously a one-eyed rock-throwing cannibal, who lives in a cave (the exit of which is often blocked by a stone), kills the hero's companions, is blinded by a hot stake, and whose flock of animals is stolen by the hero and his men, all motifs which (along with still others) are also found in the Polyphemus story. In one example from Georgia, two brothers, who are being held prisoner by a giant one-eyed shepherd called "One-eye", take a spit, heat it up, stab it into the giant's eye, and escape.

There are also links with the ancient Greek myth of Prometheus. Many legends, widespread in the Caucasus, contain motifs shared with the Prometheus story. These motifs include: a giant hero, his conflict with God or gods, the stealing of fire and giving it to men, being chained, and being tormented by a bird who pecks at his liver (or heart). The Adyge/Circassian Nart Nasran, the Georgian Amirani, the Chechen Pkharmat, and the Abkhazian Abrskil, are examples of such Prometheus-like figures.

Ecology

The Caucasus is an area of great ecological importance. The region is included in the list of 34 world biodiversity hotspots. It harbors some 6400 species of higher plants, 1600 of which are endemic to the region. Its wildlife includes Persian leopards, brown bears, wolves, bison, marals, golden eagles and hooded crows. Among invertebrates, some 1000 spider species are recorded in the Caucasus. Most of arthropod biodiversity is concentrated on Great and Lesser Caucasus ranges.

The region has a high level of endemism and a number of relict animals and plants, the fact reflecting presence of refugial forests, which survived the Ice Age in the Caucasus Mountains. The Caucasus forest refugium is the largest throughout the Western Asian (near Eastern) region. The area has multiple representatives of disjunct relict groups of plants with the closest relatives in Eastern Asia, southern Europe, and even North America. Over 70 species of forest snails of the region are endemic. Some relict species of vertebrates are Caucasian parsley frog, Caucasian salamander, Robert's snow vole, and Caucasian grouse, and there are almost entirely endemic groups of animals such as lizards of genus Darevskia. In general, species composition of this refugium is quite distinct and differs from that of the other Western Eurasian refugia.

The natural landscape is one of mixed forest, with substantial areas of rocky ground above the treeline. The Caucasus Mountains are also noted for a dog breed, the Caucasian Shepherd Dog (Rus. Kavkazskaya Ovcharka, Geo. Nagazi). Vincent Evans noted that minke whales have been recorded from the Black Sea.

Energy and mineral resources
The Caucasus has many economically important minerals and energy resources, such as gold, silver, copper, iron ore, manganese, tungsten, zinc, oil, natural gas, and coal (both anthracite coal and brown).

Sport

Krasnaya Polyana is a popular centre of mountain skiing and a snowboard venue. The 2015 European Games is the first in the history of the European Games to be held in Azerbaijan.

Mountain-skiing complexes include:
Alpika-Service
Mountain roundabout
Rosa Hutor
Tsaghkadzor Ski Resort in Armenia
Shahdag Winter Complex in Azerbaijan

The 2017 Azerbaijan Grand Prix (motor racing) was the first in the history of Formula One to be held in Azerbaijan. The 2017 World Rugby Under 20 Championship was held in Georgia. In 2017 the U-19 Europe Championship (Football) was held in Georgia.

See also

 Caucasian cuisine
 Community for Democracy and Rights of Nations
 Culture of Armenia
 Culture of Azerbaijan
 Culture of Georgia (country)
 Eastern Partnership
 Eurasian Economic Union
 Euronest Parliamentary Assembly
 Khanates of the Caucasus
 Prometheism
 Regions of Europe
 Transcontinental nations

Tourism-related links
 Tourism in Armenia
 Tourism in Azerbaijan
 Tourism in Georgia
 Tourism in Russia

References

Sources
 Bachvarova, Mary R., From Hittite to Homer: The Anatolian Background of Ancient Greek Epic, Cambridge University Press, 2016. .

 Colarusso, John, Nart Sagas from the Caucasus: Myths and Legends from the Circassians, Abazas, Abkhaz, and Ubykhs, Princeton University Press, 2002, 2014. .
 Cornell, Susan E., Small Nations and Great Powers: A Study of Ethnopolitical Conflict in the Caucasus.

 Golvin, Ivan, The Caucasus.
 Griffin, Nicholas, Caucasus: A Journey to the Land Between Christianity and Islam, University of Chicago Press, 2004. .
 Hunt, David, Legends of the Caucasus, Saqi Books, London, 2012. .
 Mayor, Adrienne (2016), "Introduction to the Paperback Edition" in Nart Sagas: Ancient Myths and Legends of the Circassians and Abkhazians, by John Colarusso, Princeton University Press, 2016. .

Further reading

 
 Dubrovin, Nikolai F. The history of wars and Russian domination in the Caucasus (История войны и владычества русских на Кавказе). Sankt-Petersburg, 1871–1888, at Runivers.ru in DjVu and PDF formats.
 Fadeev, Rostislav Andreevich (1860). Sixty years of the Caucasian War (Шестьдесят лет Кавказской войны). Tiflis, at Runivers.ru in DjVu format.
 Gagarin, G. G. (1840). Costumes Caucasus (Костюмы Кавказа). Paris,  at Runivers.ru in DjVu and PDF formats.
 Gasimov, Zaur (2011). The Caucasus, European History Online, Mainz: Institute of European History, retrieved: 18 November 2011.
 Kaziev Shapi (2003). Caucasian highlanders (Повседневная жизнь горцев Северного Кавказа в XIX в.). Everyday life of the Caucasian Highlanders. The 19th Century (In the co-authorship with I. Karpeev). "Molodaya Gvardiy" publishers. Moscow

External links

Caucasian Journal — a multilingual online journal on South Caucasus
Articles and Photography on Artsakh (Nagorno-Karabakh) from UK Photojournalist Russell Pollard
Information for travellers and others about Caucasus and Georgia
Caucasian Review of International Affairs—an academic journal on the South Caucasus
BBC News: North Caucasus at a glance, 8 September 2005
United Nations Environment Programme map: Landcover of the Caucasus
United Nations Environment Programme map: Population density of the Caucasus
Food Security in Caucasus (FAO) 
Caucasus and Iran entry in Encyclopædia Iranica
University of Turin-Observatory on Caucasus
Circassians Caucasus Web (Turkish)
Georgian Biodiversity Database (checklists for ca. 11,000 plant and animal species)
WHAT TO SEE IN CAUCASUS MOUNTAINS 
The Caucasus, Regnal Chronologies (Wikiwix Archive, 8/21/2008)

 
Mountain ranges of Europe
Regions of Eurasia
Regions of Europe
Regions of Asia
Eastern Europe
Western Asia